Tummalapalli Ramalingeswara Rao (7 February 1921 – 16 October 1991) was a Telugu poet, novelist, literary critic, philosophical journalist, writer of English prose and an exponent of Mantra Shastra and tradition. His works covered a wide range of subjects like history, sociology, literature, philosophy, religion and spiritualism. His popular works include Sri Lalitha Sahasranama Stotra Bhashyamu, Sri Chakra Vilasanamu, Sri Chakra Pooja Vidhanam (Mantra Sastra, philosophy and spiritualism), Dharmanirnayam (social novel), Tikkana Somayaji (Historical novel), Sivanugrahamu Pitruyagnamu (Poetry) and Sringeri Revisited (Musings in Philosophy and mysticism).

Personal life 
Tummalapalli Ramalingeswara Rao was born on 7 February 1921 to the Telugu family of Tummalapalli Jwalapati and Mahalakshmamma in Gudivada, Krishna District of Andhra Pradesh. After completing his school education in Gudivada, he went on to study at the Government Arts College, Rajahmundry, Andhra Pradesh and received his bachelor's degree in science. Ramalingeswara Rao married Visalakshi from Telaprolu in Krishna District of Andhra Pradesh and with her had three daughters (Uma Devi, Janaki, Lakshmi Savitri) and a son (Dr. Jwalaprakasa Vidyapati). He worked in Revenue Department of West Godavari District, Andhra Pradesh. He resigned the government job to join a mining company in Cuddapah, Andhra Pradesh and worked as a business executive. He shifted to Madras in 1961 and retreated into solitude of meditation and probe into the rationality of Indian spiritual and religious thought. He shed his mortal coil on the day of Durgashtami (16 October 1991) during Navaratri.

Spirituality 
Ramalingeswara Rao secured the grace of Sri Chandrasekhara Bharati Mahaswami, the 34th Pontiff of Sringeri Sharada Peetham and he was initiated into Sri Vidya by the Mahaswami. Guru’s grace made Rao's tongue the seat of the myriad faced literary muse. He authored several books on Mantra Sastra. With the divine blessings of Sri Abhinava Vidyatirtha Mahaswami (35th Pontiff of Sringeri Sarada Peetham) and Sri Bharati Tirtha Mahaswami (36th Pontiff of Sringeri Sharada Peetham), he served as Editor of Sri Sankara Krupa (a philosophical and spiritual Telugu monthly magazine of Sringeri Sharada Peetham) for more than two decades.  After the demise of his wife, he embraced Sanyasa in 1988 at Sringeri. He was given the yogapatta (monastic name) Sri Adwayananda Bharati.

Literary career 

Tummalapalli Ramalingeswara Rao’s works include Social and historical novels, poems, books on Mantra Sastra and Darsana Sastra, books on literary criticism, essays, translations from English to Telugu, introductions and forewords, editing, short stories for children and radio talks. His books on Mantra Sastra got appreciation from Saints of Sringeri Sharada Peetham, Siddheswari Peetham,Courtallam and other scholars. His novels and literary criticism made landmarks in the history of Telugu literature. His social novel Dharmanirnayam was considered as one of the best ten novels in Telugu.  Two of his works - Dharmanirnayam and Sringeri Revisited - were translated into Kannada language.  His novels were the subject of study for doctoral level research in the field of Telugu literature.

Bibliography 
Following works of Tummalapalli Ramalingeswara Rao (Sri Adwayananda Bharati Swami in his Turiyashrama) have been published.

Poetry 
 Sivanugrahamu – Pitruyagnamu
 Hasyagaadha Dwisathi
 Preyonuvakamu
 Godavari Garbhamu
 Agnishtomamu

Social and historical novels 
 Dharmanirnayam
 Tikkana Somayaji
 Pothanamatyulu
 Tallapaka Annamacharyulu
 Manaku Migilindi
 Meenakshi Pellichesukundi

Mantra Sastra 
 Sri Chakra Vilasanamu
 Sri Chakra Pooja Vidhanamu
 Saundaryalahari
 Sri Lalitha Sahasranama Stotra Bhashyamu
 Sri Lalitha Trisathinama Bhashyanuvadamu

Literary criticism 
 Sri Tummalapalli Ramalingeswara Rao Sahitya Vimarsalu

Vedic commentary 
 Mantra Pushpamu
 Panchasukta Manyusooktamulu
 Aditya Hrudayamu
 Kesavadi Chaturvimsatinama Vyakhyanamu
 Sri Vishnu Sahasranama Stotramu
 Mohamudgaraha
 Sri Lalitha Sahasranama Stotramu
 Sri Kanakadhara Stotramu

Philosophy and religion 

 Manamu Mana Mathamu

English books 
 Sringeri Revisited
 Sri Sureswaracharya
 A Profile of Kalady
 Rationale of Mantra Sastra
 Our Sannidhanam

Translations 
 Brahmavidya Vyakhyana Simhasanamu
 Kalady
 Malli Chuchina Sringeri
 Kanchi Sri Kamakshi Devi
Sri Sankaracharya Vijayamu

Awards and honors 

 He was given the honorifics Aarsha Vidya Vachaspati, Sri Vidya Ratnakara and Sarvatantra Swatantra.
 In 1974 he was honored by a felicitations Committee in Madras.
 In 1979 he was felicitated by Kalabharati, Madras.
 In 1980 he was honored with Sri Yarlagadda Rajyalakshmi Venkanna Chowdary Kalapeetham Award.
 In 1981 he was honored on the occasion of his Shasti Poorthi in Madras.
 In 1989 Sri Adwayananda Bharati Swami (Tummalapalli Ramalingeswara Rao in his poorvashrama) was honored in Hyderabad on his completion of first Chaturmasya Vratha Deeksha.

Sri Adwayananda Bharati Swami Trust 
With a view to preserve and maintain the traditional, cultural and spiritual values and heritage of India, Sri Adwayananda Bharati Swami Trust was established in 1989 in honor of Sri Adwayananda Bharati Swami.

References

External links 
 https://tummalapalliramalingeswararao.com

Telugu poets
1921 births
1991 deaths
Telugu writers